Willa Amai (born in April 2004) is an American folk musician from Los Angeles, California. Amai has been releasing music since she was a pre-teen. She started writing songs at age 9, and signed with Linda Perry at age 12. Amai released her debut album in 2021 titled I Can Go To Bed Whenever. Amai has been profiled in Rolling Stone, People, and American Songwriter.

References

Living people
Singers from Los Angeles
American folk singers
21st-century American women singers
21st-century American singers
2004 births